NGC 1291, also known as NGC 1269, is a ring galaxy with an unusual inner bar and outer ring structure located about 33 million light-years away in the constellation Eridanus. It was discovered by James Dunlop in 1826 and subsequently entered into the New General Catalogue as NGC 1291 by Johan Ludvig Emil Dreyer. John Herschel then observed the same object in 1836 and entered it into the catalog as NGC 1269 without realizing that it was a duplicate. This galaxy was cited as an example of a "transitional galaxy" by NASA's Galaxy Evolution Explorer team in 2007.

Properties
NGC 1291 faces towards the Solar System nearly face-on. It has a prominent bulge, and is forming stars in its disk, albeit slowly, being a lenticular galaxy.

Like other early-type galaxies, NGC 1291 has a population of old globular clusters. About 65% of them belong to the "blue" population that is more metal-poor, while the rest are "red" and more metal-rich.

Gallery

References

External links 

 
Horton,  Adam. "Spitzer NGC 1291 barred spiral galaxy seen in infrared." 23 October 2014.

Ring galaxies
Eridanus (constellation)
1291
012209